The Bell Site is an archaeological site located in Winnebago County, east central Wisconsin, United States. It is a historical village from the Native American Meskwaki tribe that dates from 1680 to 1730 A.D. Previous ethnographic work in the area led to the hypothesis of a belief system where bears and dogs have transcended from their role as food into spiritually important roles. Through remains found at the site, archaeologists identified the eating patterns of the people there, some which were indicative of ritual feasting. The manner in which they discarded the remains of the bears and dogs allows for interpretation about which one played a more important role in ritualistic activity.

Geography 
Bell Site is approximately a 44.5 acre area which is then surrounded by an 18.6 acre palisaded residential core on top of a 60 foot high bank overlooking a lake. Much of the land has been altered and no clear layout can be made but there are enough deposit remains to be able to identify several features.

Recent GIS (Geographic Information System) analysis has led to the discovery of defense walls that were previously mentioned by the French in 1716.

A multitude of artifacts were also found scattered around the site suggesting that production of these artifacts may have been occurring onsite.

Meskwaki history 
Meskwaki, also known as Fox, spoke Algonquian and were agriculturists. Algonquian speaking groups typically gave bears and dogs great importance in ritualistic activity. Meskwaki origins began in Michigan but migrated around the mid 1700s to Northern Wisconsin.

They were excluded from fur trade when French contact began and moved down to Southern Wisconsin to engage in it, settling around important water sources. They gained much economic and political control that tension began to emerge between the French and other tribal groups. They would purposely aligned themselves with their enemies enemy to generate further tension. The Meskwaki Grand Village was attacked twice in 1716 and 1728 but was able to be rebuilt. In 1730, the Meskwaki were finally beaten by French and their Indian allies and they fled from Wisconsin. The few that remained settled in southwestern Wisconsin and northwestern Illinois.

Animals of significance 
There is written record about the relationship Native American people, specifically the Great Lake societies, have with animals. They believe that certain animals have spirits that can rival that of actual humans and if worshipped correctly, can provide benefits outside of the material realm.

 Bears held a special place in ritualistic activities. They were seen as a representation of great hunting, healing and danger. After killing a bear, certain ritual activities were performed with the remaining body parts. Animal skin is worn for a dance done in hopes of emulating the healing properties bears are said to have. The remains of the bones are then buried with decorations and placed at a high altitude to avoid animals scavenging which can disrupt the bear's spirit and invoke its anger.

Dogs, on the other hand, have varied in their spiritual importance. Throughout time, some were buried and some were sacrificed. Some believed that dogs have souls like humans and can function as the vessel connecting the spirit world to the physical one which is why they were used as companions. Some people were even buried with their dogs to serve them as guides in the afterworld.  Early twentieth-century Meskaki in specific believed that consuming dogs would give them access to the dogs spiritual powers and so consumed dogs in ritual settings.

Excavations 
Systemic excavations began during the late 1950s, early 1960s, when Neil Ostberg conducted what is known as salvage archeology to dig up borrowed pits that were in danger of being destroyed. He excavated a wall and a burial during his uncovering of hundreds of features.

Warren Wittry in 1959 conducted a major excavation that led to the discovery of new habitation sites and was the first to link this site to the Grand Village of Meskwaki. Large portions of the excavation and faunal assemblage were done with the help of the University of Wisconsin-Oshkosh in 1990s.

Finds and significance 

Shell tempered ceramics were found in certain pit features that were able to be dated to the Mississippian Period with AMS (Accelerator Mass Spectrometry) which used Carbon to provide relative dates. Charred corn remains were also used to further back the claim.

27 features pits that were typically used as trash bins, were selected to be analyzed. Using a variety of techniques such as floatation and soil screening, archaeologists set out to look for remains of bears and dogs.

Bear remains were small compared to the multitude found for other fauna reinforcing the claim that they were sacred. Mostly skulls were found so the remains of bears were buried carefully. In the areas where these bear remains were found there was also a high diversity of other flora and fauna which correlates with feasting activity.

Dog remains were more diverse and commonly found as they were found in more than half of the 27 pits excavated. The majority of remains were found with evidence that they were used for consumption and with other disposed food remains. Most of the dog remains were scattered and did not make up large portions of the pits they were found in. The treatment of dogs varied across sites, some were buried and others sacrificed.

References 

Archaeological sites in Wisconsin
Algonquian culture
Winnebago County, Wisconsin